"Let's Get Lost" is a jazz standard with music written by Jimmy McHugh and lyrics by Frank Loesser. The song was first performed in 1943 by Mary Martin and was included in the 1943 film Happy Go Lucky.

Other recordings
The song has since been recorded by many notable artists, including: 
Chet Baker
Russ Morgan and His Orchestra
Johnny Nash
Vince Jones 
Vaughn Monroe
Susannah McCorkle
The Ralph Sharon Quartet
Andrea Marcovicci
Dave Frishberg
Cheryl Bentyne 
Van Morrison

References

1943 songs
Songs with music by Jimmy McHugh
Songs written by Frank Loesser

Chet Baker songs